Sergeant Stripes is a TV series created by David Bonner which first aired on CBeebies on 1 September 2003. Stripes is a cute gray cat who lives in a sleepy provincial police station with little Katie and her father, PC Harker. Both they and pretty Sergeant Parker think Stripes is merely a meowing moggy, but when this little cat slopes off to his bed underneath the stairs for a nap, well, that's when the fun really starts.

Characters

The Police Station
Sergeant Stripes - the main character who lives in a sleepy provincial police station with little Katie and her father, PC Harker and of course not forgetting Sergeant Parker.
Katie - She is a little girl who is Stripes' owner. She likes Stripes a lot.
PC Harker - He is a Policeman who is Katie's father.
Sergeant Parker - She is a pretty Policewoman.

Work Colleagues
Fluffy Mouse - She is a cute little pink mouse and one of Sergeant Stripes' colleagues. She loves Stripes a lot.
Arabella the Giraffe - She is a giraffe and another one of Sergeant Stripes' colleagues.
Inspector Hector - He is a moth eaten teddy bear and the bossy superior of Sergeant Stripes and his colleagues.

Townspeople
Mr. and Mrs. Peppermint - They are pigs who run the local sweet shop and they're very kind and polite.
Mrs. Draper - She is a fussy vole.
Mr. Draper - He is Mrs. Draper's put-upon husband.
Mr. Pearson - He is a snooty fox who runs the bank.
Pip Pig - He is a small piglet, who likes playing with things (e.g. his kite, his bike, etc.).
The Little Ferret Children - They are small children. One is a girl and the other is a boy.
Susie Sycamore - She is a squirrel.
Mr. and Mrs. Merry - They are hippos who run the local funfair.
Ronnie Rabbit - a greedy rabbit who always steals sweeties from Mr. Peppermint's sweet shop.
Fire Chief Ash - the local fireman.

Voice cast
Sophie Aldred - Sergeant Stripes, Katie, Fluffy Mouse, Ferret Girl, Susie Sycamore, Mrs. Merry
Jimmy Hibbert - PC Harker, Inspector Hector, Mr. Peppermint, Mr. Draper, Mr. Pearson, Pip Pig, Ferret Boy, Mr. Merry, Ronnie Rabbit, Fire Chief Ash
Eve Karpf - Sergeant Parker, Arabella the Giraffe, Mrs. Peppermint, Mrs. Draper

Episodes

Series One

Series Two

References

External links

2003 British television series debuts
2004 British television series endings
2000s British animated television series
2000s British children's television series
British children's animated comedy television series
British police comedy television series
English-language television shows
BBC children's television shows
CBeebies
Animated television series about cats
British preschool education television series
Animated preschool education television series
2000s preschool education television series